Fittouga  is a rural commune of the Cercle of Niafunké in the Tombouctou Region of Mali. The commune contains about 64 small settlements. The administrative center (chef-lieu) is the village of Saraféré which is 35 km south east of the town of Niafunké.

References

Communes of Tombouctou Region